Gary Sain was a retired NASCAR Grand National Series driver from Hickory, North Carolina, U.S.A.

Career
Sain's career lasted from 1962 to 1967. His primary vehicle was the #80 Chevrolet owned by the Cozze Brothers. Starting with an average of 20th place and finishing an average of 22nd place, this driver usually finished near the middle of the pack in his 2379 laps of racing action. His worst season was in 1967 where he finished in 86th in the overall season standings.

Sain's only DNQ came at the result of failing to qualify for the 1967 Southern 500.

References

NASCAR drivers
People from Hickory, North Carolina
Racing drivers from North Carolina
Living people
1931 births